The 2016 Finali Mondiali was the 2016 edition of the season-ending event for all Ferrari Challenge championships. Held at the Daytona International Speedway in the United States for the first time, the event saw drivers from the Asia-Pacific, European and North American championships take part.

It was the last season in which the Ferrari 458 was used in the headline class, replaced in 2017 with the 488.

Classification

Trofeo Pirelli

Coppa Shell

See also
 2016 Ferrari Challenge North America

References

Finali 2016
Finali Mondiali
Finali Mondiali